Sherrod is both a given name and a surname. Notable people with the name include:

Given name
 Sherrod Brown (born 1952), United States Senator
 Sherrod Martin (born 1984), American football player
 Sherrod Small, American comedian
 Sherrod E. Skinner, Jr. (1929–1952), U.S. Marine and Medal of Honor recipient
 Sherrod Williams (1804–1876), U.S. Representative from Kentucky

Surname
 Bud Sherrod (1927–1980), American football player
 Charles Sherrod (1937–2022), American civil rights activist
 Charles Sherrod Hatfield (1882–1950), judge of the United States Court of Customs and Patent Appeals
 Katie Sherrod, American journalist
 Matt Sherrod (born 1968), American drummer
 Rick Sherrod (born 1979), American football player
 Robert Sherrod (1909–1994), American journalist
 Shirley Sherrod (born 1948), a US government employee who was controversially forced to resign in 2010. See Resignation of Shirley Sherrod
 William Crawford Sherrod (1835–1919), American politician and Confederate officer from Alabama

See also
 117736 Sherrod, a main-belt asteroid